MV Woods Hole is a passenger and vehicle ferry operated by the Steamship Authority.

The Authority awarded the vessel's $40.4 million construction contract to Conrad Shipyard, located in Morgan City, Louisiana, in December 2014.  Construction was completed in 2016, and Woods Hole was christened on May 20, after which she underwent dockside and sea trials before traveling north to her namesake city.  On June 13, she was commissioned into the Authority's fleet during a ceremony in Woods Hole, and began regular service four days later.  During her first few months in operation, she displayed a tendency to generate an excessive bow wave; while not impeding her operations, the Authority made some modifications in an attempt to correct the issue.

She can carry 385 people, and has a vehicle capacity of up to 10 tractor trailer trucks or 55 cars. She is powered by two MTU diesel engines, with a service speed of

References

Ferries of Massachusetts
2016 ships
Ships built in Morgan City, Louisiana